Brenda Laurel (born 1950) is an American interaction designer, video game designer, and researcher. She is an advocate for diversity and inclusiveness in video games, a "pioneer in developing virtual reality", a public speaker, and an academic. 

She was founder and chair of the Graduate Design Program at California College of the Arts (2006–2012). as well as the Media Design graduate program at Art Center College of Design (2000–2006). She has worked for Atari, co-founded the game development studio Purple Moon, and served as an interaction design consultant for multiple companies including Sony Pictures, Apple, and Citibank. As of 2021, her current work focuses on STE(A)M learning, and the application of augmented reality within it.

Early life and education
Brenda Kay Laurel was born on November 20, 1950 in Columbus, Ohio. She received her Bachelor of Arts from DePauw University, and her Masters of Fine Arts as well as her Ph.D. from Ohio State University. Her Ph.D. dissertation was published in 1986, titled "Toward the Design of a Computer-Based Interactive Fantasy System", and would form the basis of her 1993 book "Computers as Theater".

Career 
Laurel's first games were for the CyberVision platform, where she worked as a designer, programmer, and manager of educational product design from 1976–1979. She then moved to Atari as a software specialist, later becoming manager of the Home Computer Division for Software Strategy and Marketing, where she worked from 1980–1983. After finishing her Ph.D., Laurel worked for Activision from 1985–1987. In the late 1980s and early 1990s she worked as a creative consultant on a number of LucasArts Entertainment games, and Chris Crawford's Balance of the Planet. During this time Laurel also co-founded Telepresence Research, Inc., and became a research staff member at the Interval Research Corporation where she worked on research investigating the relationship between gender and technology.

She is also a board member at several companies and organizations.

Purple Moon and games for girls

As one of the earliest female game designers, Laurel became active in writing on the topic of developing video games for girls. She posited that while the early video game industry focused almost exclusively upon developing products aimed at young men, girls were not inherently disinterested in the medium. Rather, girls were simply interested in different kinds of gaming experiences. Her research suggested that young women tended to prefer experiences based around complex social interaction, verbal skills, and transmedia.

In 1996, Laurel founded Purple Moon, a software company focused on creating games aimed at young girls between the ages of 8 and 14. Laurel's vision was to create games for girls that had a greater focus on real life decision-making rather than appearances and materiality. The company was an experiment in turning research on girl's gaming preferences into marketable video games. The firm produced games designed around storytelling, open-ended exploration, and rehearsing realistic scenarios from one's day-to-day life, as opposed to competitive games featuring scores and timed segments. The company produced ten games primarily divided into two series: "Rockett", which focused around a young girl's daily interactions, and the more meditative "Secret Path" series. Purple Moon was eventually acquired by Mattel in 1999, but was later closed.

Purple Moon received criticism for focusing on designing games based on gender. The research was accused of reinforcing the differences between genders that girls were already socialized to accept, thus the focus on the stereotypically feminine values of cooperation, narrative, and socialization as opposed to the stereotypically masculine values embodied in most games as violence and competition.

Virtual reality

In 1989, Laurel and Scott Fisher founded Telepresence Research, a company focusing in first-person media, virtual reality, and remote presence research and development.

In Laurel's work regarding interface design, she is well known for her support of the theory of interactivity, the "degree to which users of a medium can influence the form or content of the mediated environment." Virtual reality, according to Laurel, is less characterized by its imaginary or unreal elements than by its multisensory representation of objects, be they real or imaginary. While discussions around virtual reality tended to center on visual representations, audio and kinesthesia are two potent sources of sensory input that virtual reality devices attempt to tap into. Laurel's 1994 Placeholder installation at Banff Center for the Arts—a collaboration with Rachel Strickland—explored these multisensory possibilities. Placeholder was the first VR project to separate gaze from direction of movement, allow for two hands to participate, support two player games, and use imagery from natural landscape. The installation allowed multiple people to construct a narrative by attaching movement trackers to its subjects' bodies while letting them navigate a virtual environment by doing common physical acts with special results, such as flapping one's arms to fly.

Academia 
Following the closure of Purple Moon, Laurel worked as chair and professor at the ArtCenter College of Design, and later the California College of the Arts, additionally becoming an adjunct professor at the University of California, Santa Cruz. She currently teaches Design Research, Critique, Methods for Innovation and Creativity, and Interaction in the Polis.

Awards
In 2015 Laurel won the Trailblazer award at the IndieCade festival.

Works

Books

 Computers as Theatre (2nd Edition), Addison-Wesley Professional, (2013) 
 Design Research: Methods and Perspectives, MIT Press, (2004) 
 Utopian Entrepreneur, MIT Press (2001) 
 Computers as Theatre, Addison-Wesley (1991) 
 The Art of Human-Computer Interface Design, Addison-Wesley (1990)

Games
Goldilocks, on CyberVision. (1978)
 Hangman, on CyberVision. (1978)
 Labyrinth: The Computer Game (1986)
 Rockett's New School, Purple Moon Media. (1997)
 Secret Paths in the Forest, Purple Moon Media. (1997) 
 Rockett's Tricky Decision, Purple Moon Media. (1998)
 Rockett's Secret Invitation, Purple Moon Media. (1998) 
 Rockett's First Dance, Purple Moon Media. (1998)
 Rockett's Adventure Maker, Purple Moon Media. (1998)
 Secret Paths to the Sea, Purple Moon Media. (1998)
 Starfire Soccer Challenge, Purple Moon Media. (1998)

Media appearances
 Colonizing Cyberspace (1991)
 Cyberpunk (1990) 
 
 "Games for girls" (TED1998)

Personal life

She works as a consultant and speaker, and is a part-time abalone diver.

See also

List of programmers
List of women in the video game industry
Women and video games
Women in computing

References

External links
 Designing for Interaction Interview

Interface designers
Virtual reality pioneers
Ohio State University alumni
DePauw University alumni
American video game designers
Women video game developers
American women game designers
Living people
California College of the Arts faculty
Women digital artists
1950 births
American women academics
21st-century American women